Stiracolpus pagoda, common name the pagoda turret, is a species of sea snail, a marine gastropod mollusk in the family Turritellidae.

Description
The shell size varies between 25 mm and 80 mm

Distribution
The type locality of this species is the northeast coast of New Zealand.

References

 Finlay H.J. (1930) Additions to the Recent fauna of New Zealand. No. 3. Transactions and Proceedings of the Royal Society of New Zealand 61: 222–247. [Published 23 August 1930] page(s): 230

External links
 

Turritellidae
Gastropods described in 1849